Target Practice is a 1974 crime novel by American author and film director Nicholas Meyer.  It was Meyer's second novel but published before the bestselling The Seven-Per-Cent Solution that same year.

Plot
Mark Brill, a private investigator, is hired by the grieving Shelly Rollins after a chance meeting on a plane to investigate charges of treason laid against her brother, a former Army officer who has recently committed suicide.

Reception
Target Practice received moderate praise from critics.  Kirkus Reviews criticized the main character as being "rather unconvincing," but described Meyer's writing as possessing "slick efficiency."  Publishers Weekly also gave the novel moderate praise, calling it "excellently built-up suspense."  Target Practice was subsequently nominated for the 1975 Edgar Award for Best First Novel, but lost to Gregory Mcdonald's Fletch.

References

1974 American novels
American crime novels
Novels by Nicholas Meyer